David Ramírez may refer to:

 David Ramírez  (footballer, born 1981), Argentine football midfielder
 David Ramírez (footballer, born 1993), Costa Rican football forward
 David Ramírez (footballer, born 1995), Mexican football right-back
 David Noel Ramírez Padilla (born 1950), dean of the Monterrey Institute of Technology
 David Ramirez (film editor), American film and television editor
 David Ramirez (musician), American musician from Austin, Texas